RenewFM is a network of Christian radio stations in New England, broadcasting Christian music and Christian talk and teaching programs.

Stations
Originally airing on WRYP, RenewFM is heard on 10 full-powered stations in Massachusetts, New Hampshire and Rhode Island, as well as 4 translators.

RenewFM's first station, WRYP, began broadcasting in 2006. In 2010, Horizon Christian Fellowship purchased WFGL and WJWT from Calvary Chapel Costa Mesa for $300,000.

Full-powered stations

Notes:

Translators

References

External links
 

Christian radio stations in the United States
American radio networks
2006 establishments in Massachusetts
Radio stations established in 2006
Christian radio stations in Massachusetts